Oscar Espinosa may refer to:

Óscar Espinosa Chepe, Cuban dissident, former prisoner of conscience
Óscar Espinosa Villarreal, Mexican politician, fugitive from justice on List of heads of government of the Mexican Federal District